Thomas Croft Buck (sometimes incorrectly referred to as Buch; born 16 July 1970) is a Danish lightweight rower.

Rowing career 
He won a gold medal at the 1992 World Rowing Championships in Montreal with the lightweight men's eight. And gold medal again the 1995 World Rowing Championships in Tampere with the lightweight men's eight. 
Buck added "Croft" as a middle name in 1991.

FISA listings
Buck is listed in the World Rowing database with various entries:
 Thomas Buck: 1988 results rowing for Denmark
 Thomas Croft: results between 1990 and 2001 rowing for Denmark
 Thomas Buch: 1994 results being based in the United States

References

1970 births
Living people
Danish male rowers
World Rowing Championships medalists for Denmark